The ITF Women's Circuit is the second tier tour for women's professional tennis organised by the International Tennis Federation, and is the tier below the WTA Tour. In 2002, the ITF Women's circuit included tournaments with prize money ranging from $10,000 to $75,000. In addition to the traditional tournament format, there were also two four-week circuits worth $40,000 each in prize money and two four-week development circuits (both held in India) each worth $20,000.

The ITF world champions in 2002 were Serena Williams (senior singles), Virginia Ruano Pascual / Paola Suárez (senior doubles), Barbora Záhlavová-Strýcová (junior singles) and Elke Clijsters (junior doubles).

Tournament breakdown by region

*Includes figures for Central America and the Caribbean

Singles titles by nation

This list displays only the top 20 nations in terms of singles titles wins.

Sources
List of ITF World Champions
ITF prize money (1983–2008) 
ITF Pro Circuit Titles Won By Nations Players in 2002

References

External links
International Tennis Federation (ITF) official website

 
ITF Women's World Tennis Tour
ITF Circuit
2002 in women's tennis